Stanley Dimbleby (27 November 1916 – 17 October 1992) was an English footballer who played at left-half for Hull City and Port Vale.

Career
Dimbleby played for Killingholme and Hull City, before joining Third Division North club Port Vale in June 1937. He made his debut in a 2–1 win at near-rivals Crewe Alexandra on 18 September 1937, but was not selected again before being handed a free transfer at the end of the 1937–38 season in May 1938.

Career statistics
Source:

References

1916 births
1992 deaths
People from the Borough of North Lincolnshire
English footballers
Association football midfielders
Hull City A.F.C. players
Port Vale F.C. players
English Football League players